The following is a list of squads for each nation competing at the 2015 ISF Men's World Championship

Pool A

Head Coach Julio Gamarci
Assistant Coaches Andrés Gamarci, Alberto Guerrinieri, Kevin Bolzán, Rafael Salguero, Nicolás Jiménez, Javier Martinez, Jacinto Cipriota

Head Coach John Stuart
Assistant Coaches Glenn Boles, John Hill, Les Howey

Head Coach Tomáš Kusý
Assistant Coaches Jaroslav Korčák, Petr Novák





Head Coach Mark Sorenson
Assistant Coaches Carl Franklin

Head Coach Alejandro Estipular

Assistant Coaches Noel Bumagat, Raymundo Pagkaliwagan, Apolonio Rosales

Pool B

Head Coach Laing Harrow
Assistant Coaches Bob Harrow, Darrin Hebditch





Head Coach Nobunori Nishimura

Assistant Coaches Tatsuya Hamaguchi, Takeo Kido





Head Coach Denny Bruckert
Assistant Coaches Greg Hicks, Gregg Leather, Nick McCurry



References

ISF Men's World Championship rosters
Men's Softball World Championship